Lottia pelta, common name the shield limpet, is a species of sea snail, a true limpet, a marine gastropod mollusk in the family Lottiidae. It is still designated under its synonym Collisella pelta (Eschscholtz, 1833) in many textbooks.

Distribution
The shield limpet is found in the intertidal zone on rocks and kelp holdfast from Alaska to Baja California. The largest specimens occur in the northern part of the range.

Description
This shell of this species grows to a width of between 2.5 and 5.4 cm on a broadly elliptical to oval base. It is only moderately elevated. The apex is tilted toward the front end and the sides of the shell are slightly convex. The color of the shell is grayish with irregular, radial stripes. When Lottia pelta moves among substrata the morphology and the color of its shell changes. The ontogenetic record of its past habitats is preserved in the shell structure.  The species found on kelp holdfasts have darker shells with obscure ribbing.

The sculpture of the shell is smooth or with irregular, fine radial riblets. Occasionally they become heavy ribs.

The interior of the shell has about the same color as the exterior. There is a dark brown central spot. The base of the interior is marked by alternating dark and light spots.

One of its predators is Ocenebra lurida (Middendorff, 1849), a murex snail.

References

External links 

Lottiidae
Molluscs of the Pacific Ocean
Taxa named by Martin Rathke
Gastropods described in 1833